Isobel Rowena Thomson (born 18 September 1954 in Ranfurly, New Zealand) is a retired field hockey player from New Zealand, who was a member of the national team that finished sixth at the 1984 Summer Olympics in Los Angeles, California.

References
 New Zealand Olympic Committee

External links
 

New Zealand female field hockey players
Olympic field hockey players of New Zealand
Field hockey players at the 1984 Summer Olympics
1954 births
Living people
People from Ranfurly, New Zealand